IEEE 802.11a-1999 or 802.11a was an amendment to the IEEE 802.11 wireless local network specifications that defined requirements for an orthogonal frequency-division multiplexing (OFDM) communication system. It was originally designed to support wireless communication in the unlicensed national information infrastructure (U-NII) bands (in the 5–6 GHz frequency range) as regulated in the United States by the Code of Federal Regulations, Title 47, Section 15.407. 

Originally described as clause 17 of the 1999 specification, it is now defined in clause 18 of the 2012 specification and provides protocols that allow transmission and reception of data at rates of 1.5 to 54Mbit/s. It has seen widespread worldwide implementation, particularly within the corporate workspace. While the original amendment is no longer valid, the term "802.11a" is still used by wireless access point (cards and routers) manufacturers to describe interoperability of their systems at 5.8 GHz, 54 Mbit/s (54 x 106 bits per second).

802.11 is a set of IEEE standards that govern wireless networking transmission methods. They are commonly used today in their 802.11a, 802.11b, 802.11g, 802.11n, 802.11ac and 802.11ax versions to provide wireless connectivity in the home, office and some commercial establishments.

Description 
IEEE802.11a is the first wireless standard to employ packet based OFDM, based on a proposal from Richard van Nee from Lucent Technologies in Nieuwegein. OFDM was adopted as a draft 802.11a standard in July 1998 after merging with an NTT proposal. It was ratified in 1999. The 802.11a standard uses the same core protocol as the original standard, operates in 5 GHz band, and uses a 52-subcarrier orthogonal frequency-division multiplexing (OFDM) with a maximum raw data rate of 54 Mbit/s, which yields realistic net achievable throughput in the mid-20 Mbit/s. The data rate is reduced to 48, 36, 24, 18, 12, 9 then 6 Mbit/s if required. 802.11a originally had 12/13 non-overlapping channels, 12 that can be used indoor and 4/5 of the 12 that can be used in outdoor point to point configurations. Recently many countries of the world are allowing operation in the 5.47 to 5.725 GHz Band as a secondary user using a sharing method derived in 802.11h. This will add another 12/13 Channels to the overall 5 GHz band enabling significant overall wireless network capacity enabling the possibility of 24+ channels in some countries. 802.11a is not interoperable with 802.11b as they operate on separate bands, except if using equipment that has a dual band capability. Most enterprise class Access Points have dual band capability.

Using the 5 GHz band gives 802.11a a significant advantage, since the 2.4 GHz band is heavily used to the point of being crowded.  Degradation caused by such conflicts can cause frequent dropped connections and degradation of service. However, this high carrier frequency also brings a slight disadvantage:  The effective overall range of 802.11a is slightly less than that of 802.11b/g; 802.11a signals cannot penetrate as far as those for 802.11b because they are absorbed more readily by walls and other solid objects in their path and because the path loss in signal strength is proportional to the square of the signal frequency. On the other hand, OFDM has fundamental propagation advantages when in a high multipath environment, such as an indoor office, and the higher frequencies enable the building of smaller antennas with higher RF system gain which counteract the disadvantage of a higher band of operation. The increased number of usable channels (4 to 8 times as many in FCC countries) and the near absence of other interfering systems (microwave ovens, cordless phones, baby monitors) give 802.11a significant aggregate bandwidth and reliability advantages over 802.11b/g.

Regulatory issues 
Different countries have different regulatory support, although a 2003 World Radiotelecommunications Conference improved worldwide standards coordination.  802.11a was quickly approved by regulations in the United States and Japan, but in other areas, such as the European Union, it had to wait longer for approval.  European regulators were considering the use of the European HIPERLAN standard, but in mid-2002 cleared 802.11a for use in Europe.

Timing and compatibility of products 

802.11a products started shipping late, lagging 802.11b products due to 5 GHz components being more difficult to manufacture. First generation product performance was poor and plagued with problems. When second generation products started shipping, 802.11a was not widely adopted in the consumer space primarily because the less-expensive 802.11b was already widely adopted.  However, 802.11a later saw significant penetration into enterprise network environments, despite the initial cost disadvantages, particularly for businesses which required increased capacity and reliability over 802.11b/g-only networks.

With the arrival of less expensive early 802.11g products on the market, which were backwards-compatible with 802.11b, the bandwidth advantage of the 5 GHz 802.11a was eliminated.  Manufacturers of 802.11a equipment responded to the lack of market success by significantly improving the implementations (current-generation 802.11a technology has range characteristics nearly identical to those of 802.11b), and by making technology that can use more than one band a standard.

Dual-band, or dual-mode Access Points and Network Interface Cards (NICs) that can automatically handle a and b/g, are now common in all the markets, and very close in price to b/g- only devices.

Technical description 
Of the 52 OFDM subcarriers, 48 are for data and 4 are pilot subcarriers with a carrier separation of 0.3125 MHz (20 MHz/64). Each of these subcarriers can be a BPSK, QPSK, 16-QAM or 64-QAM. The total bandwidth is 20 MHz with an occupied bandwidth of 16.6 MHz. Symbol duration is 4 microseconds, which includes a guard interval of 0.8 microseconds. The actual generation and decoding of orthogonal components is done in baseband using DSP which is then upconverted to 5 GHz at the transmitter. Each of the subcarriers could be represented as a complex number. The time domain signal is generated by taking an Inverse Fast Fourier transform (IFFT). Correspondingly the receiver downconverts, samples at 20 MHz and does an FFT to retrieve the original coefficients. The advantages of using OFDM include reduced multipath effects in reception and increased spectral efficiency.

Comparison

See also
 List of WLAN channels
 OFDM system comparison table
 Spectral efficiency comparison table

References

General
 

A